Hamilton Township is a township in Monroe County, Pennsylvania, United States. The population was 8,635 at the 2020 census.

History
The Christ Hamilton United Lutheran Church and Cemetery, Fenner–Snyder Mill, and Quiet Valley Farm are listed on the National Register of Historic Places.

Geography
The township contains the unincorporated communities of Blue Mountain Pines, Bossardsville, Hamilton Square, Kellersville, Kemmererville, Sandhill, Sciota, Snydersville, and Stormville, plus a portion of Saylorsburg.

Demographics

As of the census of 2000, there were 8,235 people, 2,947 households, and 2,207 families residing in the township.  The population density was 215.0 people per square mile (83.0/km2).  There were 3,299 housing units at an average density of 86.1/sq mi (33.3/km2).  The racial makeup of the township was 94.92% White, 2.43% African American, 0.10% Native American, 1.00% Asian, 0.05% Pacific Islander, 0.67% from other races, and 0.84% from two or more races. Hispanic or Latino of any race were 2.78% of the population.

There were 2,947 households, out of which 33.6% had children under the age of 18 living with them, 63.9% were married couples living together, 7.3% had a female householder with no husband present, and 25.1% were non-families. 19.5% of all households were made up of individuals, and 7.4% had someone living alone who was 65 years of age or older.  The average household size was 2.64 and the average family size was 3.05.

In the township the population was spread out, with 23.8% under the age of 18, 6.3% from 18 to 24, 29.6% from 25 to 44, 26.8% from 45 to 64, and 13.4% who were 65 years of age or older.  The median age was 40 years. For every 100 females, there were 102.0 males.  For every 100 females age 18 and over, there were 100.9 males.

The median income for a household in the township was $47,327, and the median income for a family was $54,955. Males had a median income of $42,847 versus $26,141 for females. The per capita income for the township was $22,153.  About 5.1% of families and 6.4% of the population were below the poverty line, including 7.7% of those under age 18 and 8.8% of those age 65 or over.

Climate

According to the Trewartha climate classification system, Hamilton Township has a Temperate Continental climate (Dc) with hot summers (a), cold winters (o) and year-around precipitation (Dcao). Dcao climates are characterized by at least one month having an average mean temperature ≤ , four to seven months with an average mean temperature ≥ , at least one month with an average mean temperature ≥  and no significant precipitation difference between seasons. Although most summer days are slightly humid in Hamilton Township, episodes of heat and high humidity can occur with heat index values > . July is the peak month for thunderstorm activity, which correlates with the average warmest month of the year. The average wettest month is September, which correlates with tropical storm remnants during the peak of the Atlantic hurricane season. Since 1981, the wettest calendar day has been 6.22 inches, (158 mm) on October 8, 2005. Since 1981, the coldest air temperature has been on January 21, 1994. Episodes of extreme cold and wind can occur, with wind chill values < . The average snowiest month is January, which correlates with the average coldest month of the year. Ice storms and large snowstorms depositing ≥ 12 inches (30 cm) of snow occur once every couple of years, particularly during nor’easters from December through March.

Transportation

Multiple highways serve Hamilton Township. The most prominent of these is Interstate 80, which follows the Keystone Shortway along a northwest-southeast alignment across the northern corner of the township. U.S. Route 209 follows a southwest-northeast alignment across the middle of the township. U.S. Route 209 Business starts at US 209 in the western section of the township and heads northeastward just northwest of US 209. Pennsylvania Route 33 follows a north-south alignment through the middle of the township, including a concurrency with US 209. Finally, Pennsylvania Route 611 follows a northwest-southeast alignment across the northern tip of the township, just north of I-80.

Tornado

On Wednesday, July 29, 2009, an EF2 tornado touched down in Hamilton Township and tore through the landscape for five miles across Hamilton Township and  neighboring Stroud Township. Three minor injuries, five homes damaged, and multiple farm buildings were destroyed because of the tornado.

Ecology

According to the A. W. Kuchler U.S. potential natural vegetation types, Hamilton Township would have a dominant vegetation type of Appalachian Oak (104) with a dominant vegetation form of Eastern Hardwood Forest (25). The peak spring bloom typically occurs in late-April and peak fall color usually occurs in mid-October.

Notable person
Johann Adam Eyer, fraktur artist

References

Townships in Monroe County, Pennsylvania
Townships in Pennsylvania